Mission Creek Preserve is a Wildlands Conservancy nature preserve consisting of  of land in Riverside County, California west of Morongo Valley. Perennial Mission Creek flows through a desert canyon. The preserve is located within the San Bernardino Mountains and is part of the Sand to Snow National Monument.

Recreation
The preserve has hiking trails, picnic area, restroom and walk-in campground.

There is a parking lot before a locked gate.
To drive past the locked gate one must contact the Conservancy.
Just past the gate are the remains of an old tourist ranch.
There are four stone cabins each with a picnic table inside.
Nearby is an old pool foundation and stone chimney.

Hikers can walk on the dirt road to the Stone House Campground.
A densely vegetated wetlands will be passed.
The Stone House has picnic tables and informational displays inside.
A restroom is next to it.

The trail continues up the canyon eventually intersecting with the Pacific Crest Trail.
North of the junction on the PCT is San Gorgonio Overlook which provides a view of Whitewater Canyon and San Gorgonio Mountain.
Heading south on the PCT reaches the Whitewater Preserve.

Guided nature walks are offered.
Interpretive program for kids focuses on desert water cycles and watershed ecology.

Geography
The Stone House Campground is at an altitude of 2,458 feet.
Mission Creek flows year-round.
The preserve is located in an ecotone where the Mojave Desert and Sonoran Desert overlap.
Despite being in a desert there is a rich riparian habitat due to the creek.
The preserve is surrounded by the Bureau of Land Management's San Gorgonio Wilderness and is within the Sand to Snow National Monument.  

The southern section of the San Andreas Fault has multiple strands.
The Mission Creek strand which runs through the preserve may have a higher risk of slipping than other strands.

Downhill from the preserve the earthquake fault blocks the water from reaching the surface. As a result there is minimal vegetation below the preserve.

The Conservancy has three desert preserves in this region: Whitewater Preserve, Mission Creek Preserve, and Pioneertown Mountains Preserve.

Flora and Fauna
Large mammals include Desert bighorn sheep, mountain lions and bear.

Over 200 species of birds have been observed.

Wildflowers can be excellent in the spring if there was sufficient rain the prior winter.

Painted Hills Wetland is a heavily vegetated wetlands area with giant Cottonwoods.

History
In the early 1900s T Cross K Ranch operated as a guest ranch with house, stone cabins and swimming pool. Remnants of these remain. By the 1950s the ranch ceased hosting tourists.

In 1997, TWC acquired the property and opened the preserve to the public for light recreation.

In 2016, President Obama designated Sand to Snow National Monument, which includes this preserve.

References

Bibliography
 

Nature reserves in California
Protected areas of Riverside County, California